Pádraig, Pádraic or Páraic is an Irish male name deriving from the Latin Patricius, meaning "of the patrician class", introduced via the name of Saint Patrick. Patrick is the English version.

Diminutives include Páidín, Páidí (both anglicised as 'Paudeen' and 'Paudie' respectively) and Pádraigín (little Patrick), which was originally an exclusively masculine name before later being viewed as the Irish equivalent of the feminine name 'Patricia'. Pádraig is also sometimes anglicised as Paddy or Podge; the former anglicisation is often used, sometimes pejoratively, as a term for Irish people as a whole.

Famous people called Padraic, Pádraig or Pauric
 Liam Pádraic Aiken (born 1990), American actor
 Pádraig Amond (born 1988), Irish footballer
 Pádraig de Brún (1889–1960), Irish clergyman, mathematician and classical scholar
 Pauric Clancy, Gaelic football player from County Laois in Ireland
 Padraic Colum (1881–1972), author
 Pádraic Delaney (born 1977), Irish actor
 Pádraig Duggan (born Pádraig Ó Dúgáin, 1949–2016), Irish musician
 Padraic Fallon (1905–1974), Irish poet
 Pádraig Faulkner (1918–2012), Irish politician
 Pádraig Flynn (born 1939), Irish politician
 Pádraig Harrington (born 1971), professional golfer
 Pádraig Horan (born 1950), Irish hurler
 Pádraig Hughes, Gaelic football referee
 Pauric Mahony (born 1992), Irish hurler
 Pádraic McCormack (born 1942), Irish politician
 Pádraic McMahon, musician in the band The Thrills
 Padraig Parkinson, Irish professional poker player
 Pádraic Pearse (1879–1916), Irish activist/revolutionary (also known as Patrick Henry Pearse or Pádraig Pearse)

Variant spellings

Pádraig is the most popular version of the name, but other variants include:

 Padraig
 Pádraic
 Padraic
 Padric
 Pádhraig
 Padhraig
 Padraigh

 Padhraic
 Pádhraic
 Páiric
 Páraic
 Paraic
 Pauric
 Phadrig

See also
All pages beginning with Padraic or Padraig
All pages beginning with Pádraic or Pádraig

References

Irish-language masculine given names